Nevada's 7th Senate district is one of 21 districts in the Nevada Senate. It has  been represented by Democrat Roberta Lange since 2020, succeeding term-limited fellow Democrat David Parks.

Geography and demographics
District 3 is based in the Las Vegas Valley in Clark County, including most of Whitney, parts of Paradise and Henderson, and the southern tip of Sunrise Manor.

The district overlaps with Nevada's 1st and 3rd congressional districts, and with the 18th and 20th districts of the Nevada Assembly.

According to the 2010 Census, the 7th district had a population of 128,598, which was the ideal population for a senatorial district. Compared to the Nevada average, the district has a relatively low solely white population and a relatively high proportion of Hispanics and Latinos. The district has a comparatively young population, with 34% of residents between the ages of 18 and 39, and a lower education rate than the state average. The district's median household income is $46,000, which is almost $7,000 below the state median. The poverty rate of 15%, however, is the same as in the rest of the state.

Recent election results
Nevada Senators are elected to staggered four-year terms; since 2012 redistricting, the 7th district has held elections in presidential years.

2020

2016
In the 2016 Democratic primary election, incumbent David Parks faced Anthony Wernicke, an Army veteran, bus driver, and perennial candidate who had previously run for State Assembly, State Senate, and Mayor of Las Vegas. Parks, handily defeated Wernicke with over 75% of the vote. Parks' general election opponent was Libertarian Kimberly Schjang, who contrasted her opposition to tax increases with Parks' yes vote on a $1.5 billion public education funding bill. Parks defeated Schjang with nearly 70% of the vote.

2012
In 2012, incumbent Democrat David Parks, who had served for 16 years in the legislature, faced Republican Trish Marsh. Parks, who is openly gay, focused on his record fighting for LGBT rights, including a domestic partnership law he authored, as well as repealing needless tax exemptions and lowering the sales tax. Marsh, a salesperson and political newcomer, argued that Parks focused too much on LGBT rights and should prioritize other issues, such as lowering taxes and merging local and state departments. Parks, who was endorsed by the Las Vegas Review-Journal and out-raised Marsh $100,000 to $2,000, won the election with 64% of the vote.

Federal and statewide results in District 7

History 
The present 7th district was drawn during the reapportionment of the districts in 2011 after the 2010 Census. The newly drawn districts became effective for filing for office, and for nominating and electing senators on January 1, 2012, and for all other purposes on November 7 – the day after Election Day, when the new senator terms began. The area of District 7 is defined in the Nevada Revised Statutes using census tracts, block groups, and blocks.

References

External links 
 
 

7
Clark County, Nevada